Finn Surman (born 23 September 2003) is a New Zealand professional footballer who plays as a central defender for Wellington Phoenix.

Playing career
In November 2021, Surman was one of three players who travelled to Australia to join Wellington Phoenix's senior A-League Men side, forced to play away from home due to travel restrictions imposed due to the COVID-19 pandemic in New Zealand. He made his debut for the Phoenix in a win over Western United in the 2021 FFA Cup on 7 December 2021.

Surman signed a professional contract with the Phoenix in February 2022. By April 2022, Surman was making regular appearances in the Phoenix's starting side.

References

External links

Living people
New Zealand association footballers
Association football defenders
Wellington Phoenix FC players
A-League Men players
2003 births